KZJZ is an FM radio station on 106.7 MHz licensed to Babbitt, Minnesota. KZJZ is owned by Real Presence Radio.

History
95.3 FM Grand Marais (as WXXZ) and 106.7 FM Babbitt (as KOAD) formerly simulcast KQDS-FM from Duluth. In 2017, Midwest Communications sold W288AI (Ely), WXXZ (Grand Marais) and KAOD (Babbitt) to Aurora Broadcasting, finding that the rural stations did not fit their business.

In 2017, WXXZ and KOAD both changed their callsigns. WXXZ changed their callsign to WVVE, and KOAD changed their callsign to KZJZ.

In May 2018, after stunting, WVVE and KZJZ launched an adult album alternative format branded as "Radio North Of Ordinary." It was the first full-time AAA format in the region.

In December 2018, Aurora Broadcasting announced that they would sell KZJZ (106.7 FM) and FM translator W288AI (105.5 FM) to Real Presence Radio. The sale was consummated on April 30, 2019.

References

External links
 
 
 

Radio stations established in 1999
1999 establishments in Minnesota
Christian radio stations in Minnesota